Hozon Auto is a Chinese all-electric car marque, manufactured by the Zhejiang Hezhong New Energy Automobile Company.

History
It was founded in 2014 in the Zhejiang province, co-founded by Beijing Sinohytec and Zhejiang Yangtze Delta Region Institute of Tsinghua University and is based in Jiaxing. It opened an Autonomous Vehicle Research Centre in California's Silicon Valley in 2018, and a Beijing-based Design Centre opened in March 2019.

It announced its first concept car in 2017. The first production model Neta N01 compact SUV was launched in 2018 built on its HPA platform along with the launch of the Neta brand, with orders for the mid-sized Hezhong U SUV based on the HPC platform being taken in 2019. The company has plans for further models based on the two platforms.

Products
Hozon Auto currently has a single brand called Neta. All current Hozon Auto products are sold under the Neta brand.

Neta N01
The Neta N01 is a subcompact CUV launched in 2018, discontinued in 2020.

Neta U
The Neta U is a compact CUV launched in 2019.

Neta V
The Neta V is a subcompact CUV launched in 2020.

Neta S
The Neta S is a Mid-size sedan launched in 2021.

Neta GT
The Neta GT is a Mid-size coupe launched in 2023.

Product Gallery

Concepts

Sales

References

External links
 Official website

Car manufacturers of China
Electric vehicle manufacturers of China
Car brands
Chinese brands
Luxury motor vehicle manufacturers
Vehicle manufacturing companies established in 2014
Chinese companies established in 2014